Mike Kanentakeron Mitchell (or simply Mike Mitchell) is a longtime Canadian Mohawk politician, pioneering First Nations film director and a leading figure in First Nations lacrosse. First elected to the Mohawk Council of Akwesasne in 1982, he began his first term as Grand Chief in 1984. He served on the Mohawk Council almost continuously for more than 30 years, having been reelected as Grand Chief as recently as 2012.

Prior to entering politics, Mitchell studied and directed films with the National Film Board as part of its Indian Film Crew. His films include the 1969 documentary film about the 1969 Akwesasne border crossing dispute, You Are on Indian Land, for which he belatedly received directorial credit almost 50 years after its completion. For the future Grand Chief, the experience of making You Are on Indian Land blurred the lines between filmmaking and politics: 

Mitchell directed several more films on First Nations issues at the NFB, then worked with the North American Indian Traveling College (now Ronathahonni Cultural Centre) to set up replica of a traditional Mohawk settlement on Kawehno:ke (Cornwall Island) and produce educational material and videos that helped to spread Native culture awareness.

He was one of several First Nations filmmakers honoured at a retrospective screening on February 25, 2017, at TIFF Bell Lightbox. Mitchell has stated that he is retired from politics after three decades and multiple terms as Grand Chief and intends to resume filmmaking.

Mitchell is the winner of a 2016 Indspire Award for his life in politics.

Lacrosse 
Born into a lacrosse family, Mitchell played in the St. Regis, Cornwall Island and Cornwall Minor Lacrosse systems of eastern Ontario and western Quebec.

Mitchell revived the Akwesasne Minor Lacrosse Association, enabling local Mohawk teams to once again compete in the Ontario Minor Lacrosse Association, and formed the Iroquois Lacrosse Association. In 1993, Mitchell was appointed to the Canadian Lacrosse Association's Board of Directors. In 2003, he was inducted into the Canadian Lacrosse Hall of Fame as a Special Contributor. In June 2014, he received the Lester B. Pearson Award from the Canadian Lacrosse Association for his work as "a leader, a contributor, an advocate and relentless promoter of the game."

References

Akwesasne
Canadian documentary film directors
Canadian lacrosse players
Canadian Mohawk people
First Nations filmmakers
First Nations sportspeople
Indigenous leaders in Ontario
Indspire Awards
Lacrosse of the Iroquois Confederacy
Living people
National Film Board of Canada people
Political office-holders of Indigenous governments in Canada
Year of birth missing (living people)